

cb-cd
CBCDA
CCNU. Redirects to Lomustine.
CDDP

ce

cea-cee
CEA-Scan
CEA-Cide
cebaracetam (INN)
Cebid
Ceclor
Cecon
Cedax
cedefingol (INN)
cedelizumab (INN)
Cedilanid-D
cediranib (USAN, INN)
Cedocard-SR
CeeBU (Bristol-Myers Squibb) 
Ceenu
Ceepryn

cef

cefa-cefc
cefacetrile (INN)
cefaclor (INN)
cefadroxil (INN)
Cefadyl
cefalexin (INN)
cefaloglycin (INN)
cefalonium (INN)
cefaloram (INN)
cefaloridine (INN)
cefalotin (INN)
cefamandole (INN)
Cefanex
cefaparole (INN)
cefapirin (INN)
cefatrizine (INN)
cefazaflur (INN)
cefazedone (INN)
cefazolin (INN)
cefbuperazone (INN)
cefcanel daloxate (INN)
cefcanel (INN)
cefcapene (INN)
cefclidin (INN)

cefd-cefm
cefdaloxime (INN)
cefdinir (INN)
cefditoren (INN)
cefedrolor (INN)
cefempidone (INN)
cefepime (INN)
cefetamet (INN)
cefetecol (INN)
cefetrizole (INN)
cefivitril (INN)
cefixime (INN)
Cefizox
cefluprenam (INN)
Cefmax
cefmenoxime (INN)
cefmepidium chloride (INN)
cefmetazole (INN)
cefminox (INN)

cefo-cefr
Cefobid
cefodizime (INN)
cefonicid (INN)
cefoperazone (INN)
ceforanide (INN)
cefoselis (INN)
Cefotan
cefotaxime (INN)
cefotetan (INN)
cefotiam (INN)
cefovecin sodium (USAN)
cefoxazole (INN)
cefoxitin (INN)
cefozopran (INN)
cefpimizole (INN)
cefpiramide (INN)
cefpirome (INN)
cefpodoxime (INN)
cefprozil (INN)
cefquinome (INN)
cefradine (INN)
cefrotil (INN)
cefroxadine (INN)

cefs-cefz
cefsulodin (INN)
cefsumide (INN)
ceftazidime (INN)
ceftaroline fosamil (INN)
cefteram (INN)
ceftezole (INN)
ceftibuten (INN)
Ceftin
ceftiofur (INN)
ceftiolene (INN)
ceftioxide (INN)
ceftizoxime alapivoxil (INN)
ceftizoxime (INN)
ceftobiprole (INN)
ceftolozane (USAN, INN)
Ceftriaxone
ceftriaxone (INN)
cefuracetime (INN)
Cefuroxime
cefuroxime (INN)
cefuzonam (INN)
Cefzil

cel-cep
Cel-U-Jec
Celebrex (Searle) 
celecoxib (INN)
Celectol
Celestoderm-V
Celestone
Celexa
celgosivir (INN)
celiprolol (INN)
celivarone (INN)
cellaburate (INN)
cellacefate (INN)
Cellcept
Cellufresh
Celluvisc
celmoleukin (INN)
Celontin
celucloral (INN)
cemadotin (INN)
Cena-K
cenderetide (USAN, INN)
cenersen (USAN, INN)
Cenestin
cenicriviroc (USAN), INN)
cenisertib (INN)
Cenocort Forte
Cenolate
cenplacel-L  (USAN)
Centany
Centrax
Centrum
Cepastat
cepeginterferon alfa-2b (INN)CephadynCephalexinCephulacCeporacinCeptazcer-cesCeradonCerebyxCeredase (Genzyme Corporation)CeretecCerezyme (Genzyme Corporation)cericlamine (INN)cerivastatin (INN)Cernevit-12ceronapril (INN)Cerose-DMcertolizumab pegol (INN)certoparin sodium (INN)Cerubidine (Bedford Labs) ceruletide (INN)CerumenexCervidilCerverixCesamet (Meda Pharmaceuticals)cesium-131 chloride (INN)

cetCeta-Pluscetaben (INN)CetacaineCetacortcetalkonium chloride (INN)Cetamidecetamolol (INN)CetaneCetapredcetefloxacin (INN)cetermin (INN)cethexonium chloride (INN)cethromycin (USAN)cetiedil (INN)cetilistat (USAN)cetirizine (INN)cetocycline (INN)cetofenicol (INN)cetohexazine (INN)cetomacrogol 1000 (INN)cetorelix (INN)cetotiamine (INN)cetoxime (INN)cetraxate (INN)cetrimide (INN)cetrimonium bromide (INN)cetrorelix (INN)Cetrotidecetuximab (INN)cetylpyridinium chloride (INN)
cevCevi-Bidcevimeline (INN)cevipabulin (USAN, INN)cevoglitazar''' (INN)